Lavender Diamond is an American, Los Angeles-based band, fronted by singer Becky Stark.

History
While living in Providence, Rhode Island, Stark began performing as Lavender Diamond in a play that she and puppeteer Xander Marro wrote, created and toured with called Birdsongs of the Bauharoque inspired by the work of artist Paul Laffoley. A self-produced CD of Stark's songs accompanied the tour in a hand-sewn, silkscreened sleeve. Lavender Diamond became a duo and eventually a four-piece band after Stark relocated to Los Angeles. With the help of local patrons Brian Kaneda and Josh Scuteri, Lavender Diamond self-released a four-song EP and performed at L.A.'s ArthurFest, at South by Southwest in Austin, Texas, and at the CMJ New Music Seminar in New York City. In 2006 Lavender Diamond signed to Rough Trade Records in Europe, and Matador Records in the U.S., and toured and performed with The Decemberists for three weeks.

In 2007 the band released its first full-length album, Imagine Our Love and appeared on the Madonna tribute/charity record, Through the Wilderness. In 2009 they covered "Purple Rain" for SPIN Magazine's tribute to Prince's "Purple Rain".

The band parted ways with Matador and went on hiatus for a few years while its members continued to work and play in other projects. In 2011, the original Lavender Diamond lineup reunited for a few concerts in the Los Angeles area, and in 2012 released their second album, Incorruptible Heart.

Rege furnishes Lavender Diamond with all of its artwork.

Members
 Becky Stark — vocals
 Steve Gregoropoulos — piano, vocals
 Ron Regé Jr. — drums, artwork
 Jeffrey Rosenberg — guitar, vocals

Former members
 Devon Williams — guitar, vocals
 Jeff Kwong — guitar

Discography

Albums
 Artifacts Of The Winged 12-song solo CD (2003, self-released)
 Imagine Our Love full-length album (2007)
 Incorruptible Heart full-length album (2012)
 "Now Is The Time" full-length album (2020)

Singles and EPs
 "When Are You Coming Home?" b/w "Wild" (2003, self-released)
 Themepark Ashtray 7" with Vague Angels (2004, Pretty Activity)
 Cavalry of Light EP (2005, self-released)
 "Christmas Time Celebration / The Song Of Impossible Occurrences" 7" with The Queens of Sheeba, Devendra Banhart (2005, Cold Sweat records)
 Open Your Heart EP (2007, Rough Trade Records, with Colin Meloy)
 "Everybody's Heart's Breaking Now" (2012, Paracadute)

Compilation appearances
 Hen House Studios Anthology 3, 2003, performing "Lavender Diamond- Emptiness is a Conductor" (2003, Hen House Studios)
 Through the Wilderness a tribute to Madonna performing Like A Prayer (2007, Manimal Vinyl Records)
 Purplish Rain: A 25th Anniversary Tribute to Prince's Purple Rain, performing Purple Rain (2009, SPIN Magazine)
 The Switch (Music from the Motion Picture), performing "Open Your Heart" (2010, Rhino Entertainment)
 The soundtrack of game Space Ducks, performing Moment of Laughter (2012)

Mystical Unionists (Becky Stark and Ron Regé)
 An Introduction to The Mystical Union of Souls 5-song CD
 "Sketches" for The Craft of Consciousness 7"

See also
 New Weird America

References

External links

 Rolling Stone
 Arthur Magazine
 New Yorker
 Village Voice
 L.A. Weekly
 Boston Globe
 ABC News

American folk musical groups
Indie rock musical groups from California
Matador Records artists
Musical groups from Los Angeles
New Weird America
Rough Trade Records artists